Lawang Khan was the second eldest son of Mir Habib Khan, a member of the Paindzai family of the Zagr Mengal Tribe.

Education 
Lawang Khan got his early education in his native town of Noshki.

Death 

Lawang Khan died on 7 August 1973 and was buried in his home town.

See also 
 Mir Gul Khan Naseer
 Nawab Nowroz Khan
 Akbar Bugti

References 

1901 births
1973 deaths
Baloch people
People from Nushki District
Baloch nationalists